Uri Bergman (born 1953) is an Israeli paralympic swimming champion. He competed at the 1976, 1980, and 1984, and 1988 Summer Paralympics.

Life 
Bergman was born in 1953 in Kibbutz Givat Brenner and contracted polio as a young baby. In his youth he was active in the Kibbutz's water polo team, and later joining the Israel Sports Center for the Disabled. Throughout the years he won 12 medals at the Paralympic Games.

Bergman was certified as a swimming instructor, social worker and as a psychotherapist. He also completed a PhD in psychological rehabilitation and social work. Bergman was hired as coordinator for swimming and hydrotherapy at Wingate College and as a swimming coach at the Sports Center for the Disabled. He also coached Hapoel's water polo team and the Maccabiah's water polo teams in 1993. He was also head coach for Israeli swimmers attending the Paralympic Games, in some of which he was also a referee.

Bergman is active with the Israeli Paralympic Committee. In 2000, he received the John K. Williams, Jr. International Adapted Aquatics Award from the International Swimming Hall of Fame.

See also
Athletes with most gold medals in one event at the Paralympic Games

References 

1953 births
Living people
People from Givat Brenner
Israeli male swimmers
Paralympic swimmers of Israel
Swimmers at the 1976 Summer Paralympics
Swimmers at the 1980 Summer Paralympics
Swimmers at the 1984 Summer Paralympics
Swimmers at the 1988 Summer Paralympics
Paralympic gold medalists for Israel
Paralympic bronze medalists for Israel
Medalists at the 1976 Summer Paralympics
Medalists at the 1980 Summer Paralympics
Medalists at the 1984 Summer Paralympics
Medalists at the 1988 Summer Paralympics
Date of birth missing (living people)
Paralympic medalists in swimming